Ekaterina Vorona - the only modern artist in the world who has been honored to replenish the collection of the Vatican Museums.

Graduated from the Graphic Arts Department of the Moscow State Pedagogical University (1993–1998).  Laureate of a medal from the Russian Academy of Arts. Member of the Moscow Union of Artists. Honored Member (Academician) of the Russian Academy of Arts.

Works can be found in the collections of the Vatican Museum, the State Russian Museum, the State Historical Museum, the Russian Cultural Foundation, the Central Museum of the Great Patriotic War, the State Art Museum (Khanty-Mansiysk), the Lermontov Art Museum, the Kostroma State Art Museum, as well as many private and corporate collections in Russia, Europe, China, and the United States.

Exhibitions 
2019

Solo exhibition, museum Palazzo Collicola. Spoleto (Italy).

Libres y decisivas. Artistas rusas, entre tradición y vanguardia, Collection del Museo Ruso. Malaga (Spain).

Solo exhibition «Dreamscape», Piazza di Pietra, 28. Rome (Italy).

2018

Solo exhibition «WORLD OF WATER», POP UP Museum.

Bonhams auction in London

Solo exhibition in the Auditorium.

Russische Kunst heute, Osthaus-Museum Hagen (Germany)

2017

Bonhams auction in London

Solo Exhibition “Ekaterina Vorona. The Music of Water”, Exposed.

2016

Solo Exhibition, State Russian Museum

Solo Exhibition, Moscow Gostiny Dvor

2014

Solo Exhibition, Ministry of Culture of the Russian Federation

Solo Exhibition, All Russia Decorative Arts Museum.

2013

Solo Exhibition, Central Museum of the Great Patriotic War.

2010

Solo Exhibition, Federation Tower

2008

Solo Exhibition, Central House of Architects

2000

Solo Exhibition, Exlibris Museum

Publications 

Ekaterina Vorona. Russian State Museum. Palace Editions, St. Petersburg, 2016  Editor-in-chief: E.Petrova 
Article: A.Borovsky, K. Suljano
228 pages, 144 coloured illustrations, 1 photograph 
Format: 30x30; Russian, English

Ekaterina Vorona. International Cultural Cooperation Foundation «IMAGE», Moscow, 2013 
Editor-in-chief: А. Smirnov 
Article: Li Huei, G. Ivliev, 126 pages, 105 coloured illustrations, 
Format: 30x40; Russian, Chinese

Ekaterina Vorona. M-Scanrus, Moscow, 2009
Editor-in-chief: E.Lavrinenko
Article: A.Rozjin, 143 pages,
Format: 25x25; Russian, English

References

External links

Profile at Smirnoff.gallery website

1975 births
Living people
Russian contemporary artists
21st-century Russian women artists
Honorary Members of the Russian Academy of Arts